The 2nd Canadian Mounted Rifles Battalion, (known colloquially as the 2nd Battalion, CMR or simply 2 CMR) was authorized on 7 November 1914 as the 2nd Regiment, Canadian Mounted Rifles, CEF. The battalion recruited in Victoria and Vernon, British Columbia and was mobilized in Victoria.  An earlier incarnation was raised for Boer War.

Boer War
In November 1901, the British government requested from the Canadian government a four-squadron regiment of mounted rifles for the Boer War.  Canadian Department of Militia and Defence equipped and trained the unit, while the British paid its costs. The majority of the officers and at least a quarter of the men had previously served in South Africa, including its commander Lieutenant-Colonel T.D.B. Evans. On 31 March the unit fought as part of an outnumbered British force at the Battle of Harts River, or Boschbult.  The unit participated in a number of other drives to round up Boers before the war ended on 31 May 1902.

World War I
The 2nd Regiment, Canadian Mounted Rifles was mobilized on 15 March 1915, at Willows Camp, Victoria. Most of their recruits would come from the local militia cavalry units: the 30th British Columbia Horse and the Victoria Squadron of Horse.

The regiment embarked for Great Britain on 12 June 1915. It disembarked in France on 22 September 1915 as part of the 1st Canadian Mounted Rifles Brigade. On 1 January 1916 it was converted to infantry, amalgamated with 'B Squadron' and the headquarters staff of the 3rd Regiment, Canadian Mounted Rifles, CEF and re-designated the 2nd Canadian Mounted Rifles Battalion, CEF. It fought as part of the 8th Canadian Infantry Brigade, 3rd Canadian Division in France and Flanders until the end of the war.

The battalion was disbanded on 6 November 1920.

Commanding officers
Lieutenant-Colonel J.C. Bott, 12 June 1915 – 27 November 1916
Lieutenant-Colonel G.C. Johnston, 27 November 1916–demobilization

Battle honours
 Mount Sorrel
 Somme, 1916
 Flers-Courcelette
 Ancre Heights
 Arras, 1917, '18
 Vimy, 1917
 Hill 70
 Ypres, 1917
 Passchendaele
 Amiens
 Scarpe, 1918
 Hindenburg Line
 Canal du Nord
 Cambrai, 1918
 Pursuit to Mons
 France and Flanders, 1915–18

Awards 
Capt. John MacGregor was awarded the Victoria Cross for his actions during the Battle of the Canal du Nord from 29 September to 3 October 1918.

Perpetuation 
The 2nd Canadian Mounted Rifles Battalion is perpetuated by The British Columbia Dragoons.

See also 
 Canadian Mounted Rifles
 List of mounted regiments in the Canadian Expeditionary Force
 List of infantry battalions in the Canadian Expeditionary Force

References

Sources
Canadian Expeditionary Force 1914-1919 by Col. G.W.L. Nicholson, CD, Queen's Printer, Ottawa, Ontario, 1962

Battalions of the Canadian Expeditionary Force
Military units and formations of British Columbia
Military units and formations disestablished in 1920